Backwell Hillfort is an Iron Age hill fort situated approximately  from Backwell in the North Somerset district of Somerset, England. The hill fort was first discovered in 1933 with two of the three sides of the fort protected by a large ditch and a bank. In 1956, the site was nearly completely destroyed by quarrying at Coles Quarry, which ceased production in the 1970's.

See also
List of hill forts and ancient settlements in Somerset

References

Hill forts in Somerset
Iron Age sites in Somerset
Scheduled monuments in North Somerset